Nicolette Kloe Robinson (born April 18, 1988) is an American stage and television actress. She is known for her role as Jane in the television show The Affair and Jenna in the stage musical Waitress, the latter of which marked her debut on Broadway.

Early life 
Robinson was born on April 18, 1988 in Los Angeles, California, to a Jewish mother and an African-American father. She has joked that her family "looks like the U.N." She attended the University of California, Los Angeles, where Robinson majored in musical theater. While in school she performed in multiple stage productions, UCLA's Awaken A Cappella, and received the Gant Gaither Theater Award from the Princess Grace Foundation-USA. Robinson also received a scholarship from the Jackie Robinson Foundation.

Personal life 
In 2012, Robinson married actor Leslie Odom Jr., whom she met in 2008 while auditioning for a role in the musical Once on This Island in Los Angeles. Odom, who would later become known for originating the role of Aaron Burr in the stage musical Hamilton, served as the assistant director of Once on This Island. As Robinson would be replacing an actor who had left the production, Odom was tasked with ensuring that she easily transitioned into the role. The two began a relationship after the show's run ended.

On April 23, 2017, the two had their first child, a daughter named Lucille Ruby. In November 2020, Robinson announced that she and her husband were expecting their second child, a boy, in March 2021.
On March 25, 2021, their son, Able Phineas, was born.

Performances

Stage

Television

Film

References

External links
 
 
 

American musical theatre actresses
American television actresses
Living people
University of California, Los Angeles alumni
Actresses from Los Angeles
1988 births
Jewish American actresses
Singers from Los Angeles
21st-century American actresses
21st-century American women singers
African-American Jews
Jewish women musicians
21st-century American singers
African-American women musicians
21st-century African-American women singers
21st-century American Jews
20th-century African-American people
20th-century African-American women